Patricia de Stacy Harrison (born 1939) is an American public relations executive and government official, currently serving as president and chief executive officer of the Corporation for Public Broadcasting, a non-profit established by the federal government to support public radio and television broadcasting.

Early life and education
Harrison is a native of Brooklyn, New York. She earned a bachelor's degree from the American University School of International Service in Washington, D.C.

Career 
In 1973 she co-founded the PR agency the E. Bruce Harrison Company with her husband E. Bruce Harrison. While working with the company, which was sold in a merger deal in 1996, "she created and directed programs in the public interest comprising diverse stakeholder groups, including the National Environmental Development Association, a partnership of labor, agriculture and industry working for better environmental solutions together."

George H. W. Bush appointed Harrison to the President's Export Council in the United States Department of Commerce in 1990. She was elected co-chair of the Republican National Committee in 1997, serving until 2001, when she was appointed to the post of Assistant Secretary of State for Educational and Cultural Affairs by then-Secretary of State Colin Powell.

Under Harrison's direction, the State Department initiated the CultureConnect program in which American celebrities including YoYo Ma, Denyce Graves, Doris Roberts and Frank McCourt acted as "cultural ambassadors" in trips to Pakistan, Russia, Israel, and other countries.

In June 2005 she was appointed president and CEO of the Corporation for Public Broadcasting. Later that year, the process by which she was selected was called into question by a report from the Inspector General of the CPB. The report concluded that then-CPB chairman Kenneth Tomlinson "was strongly motivated by political considerations in filling the president/CEO position". Tomlinson resigned from the CPB board on November 4, 2005, and was replaced by Cheryl Halpern. Harrison remains CPB president and CEO .

In 2015, Harrison gave public support to the work of the David Lynch Foundation.

Books
Patricia Harrison (ed), America's New Women Entrepreneurs: Tips, Tactics, and Techniques of Women Achievers in Business, Acropolis Books, May 1986, 
Patricia Harrison, Seat At The Table: An Insider's Guide for America's New Women Leaders, Mastermedia Publishing Company, February 1996,

Speeches
Patricia Harrison, Assistant Secretary of State for Educational and Cultural Affairs, "The Role of International Education in the Struggle Against Terrorism", U.S. Department of State, November 25, 2003.
Pat Harrison, "Ask the White House", The White House, March 12, 2004.

References

External links

1939 births
Living people
American University School of International Service alumni
Assistant Secretaries of State for Education and Culture
Corporation for Public Broadcasting